Associazione Calcio Dilettantistico Campodarsego is an Italian association football club located in Campodarsego, Veneto. It currently plays in Serie D.

History
The club was founded in 1974 as A.C. Reschigliano. In 2002 the A.C. Reschigliano, rests with U.S. Campodarsego, giving life to the team A.C.D. Alta Padovana. In 2007 the team changed its name to A.C.D. Campodarsego. In 2015, for the first time in its history, achieved promotion to Serie D.

In 2019–20, Campodarsego for the first time in its history won promotion to Serie C, but later the club announced that it definitely renounced promotion because of economic problems.

Colors and badge
Its colors are red and white, from 1974 to 2002 and from 2007 to present. From 2002 to 2007 the colors was red and blue.

Players

Current squad

Honours 
Serie D/C: 12019-20Coppa Italia Serie D: 12017-18Eccellenza Veneto/A: 1'''
2014-2015

References

External links
 Official site
 History on Veneziaunited

Football clubs in Italy
Association football clubs established in 1974
Football clubs in Veneto
1974 establishments in Italy